Perry Mubanga is a Zambian football defender.

Career
He plays for Power Dynamos FC in Kitwe, Zambia and has played for the Zambian national team. He has also played for Kitwe United.

References

Year of birth missing (living people)
Living people
Zambian footballers
Zambia international footballers

Association football defenders
Zambia A' international footballers
2009 African Nations Championship players